Eric Genuis is a Canadian composer and pianist who now lives in Louisville, Kentucky, U.S.

He is noted for his Concerts for Hope. He performs his original compositions more than a hundred times a year.

Genuis was born in Toronto, Canada on March 13, 1967. He earned a degree in piano performance from the Royal Conservatory of Music in Canada. He also studied to become a math and physics teacher.

He is known for playing in prisons, hospitals, rehab centres, nursing homes and inner-city schools. He started playing in prisons when he was invited to a maximum security prison. He feels music brings humanity and beauty to places lacking in these virtues.

He has performed across the world in countries including the United States, Australia, Austria, Canada, France, Germany, Peru, Poland and Slovakia.

In February 2019 Genuis began his second tour of Australia playing in Corrimal, New South Wales and Windang, New South Wales.

Discography
Albums

 Last in Line (1993)
 No Greater Love (1995)
 Truth Never Changes (1996)
 Eternity (1997)
 Never Alone (1999)
 Fantasias for Violin and Piano (2003)			
 Legacy (2006)
 The Winds Have Changed (2007)	
 Timeless (2009)
 Redemption (2020)

References

The Royal Conservatory of Music alumni
Canadian composers
Musicians from Toronto
Canadian Catholics
Living people
1967 births